Storm is the sixth studio album by the Norwegian gothic metal band Theatre of Tragedy, released in March 2006. It is the band's first album with a new lead singer Nell Sigland. The song "Storm" was released as the album's only single. The album shows something of a return to gothic metal, although its sound is much lighter and more upbeat than that of earlier albums and it still uses modern English lyrics. The band embarked on a European tour to support the release.

The cover art was designed by Thomas Ewerhard, who also made the covers for Assembly and Forever Is the World.

The song "Senseless" was originally titled "Seven", as it is written in septuple meter and is the seventh track on the album.

Track listing

Personnel

Theatre of Tragedy
 Nell Sigland – vocals
 Raymond István Rohonyi – vocals
 Frank Claussen – guitars
 Vegard K. Thorsen – guitars
 Lorentz Aspen – keyboards and piano
 Hein Frode Hansen – drums

Additional musicians
Magnus Westgaard – bass guitar
Sareeta – violin
Rico Darum - additional programming and guitars

Production
Rico Darum – producer, engineer and editing
Børge Finstad – assistant engineer
Greg Reely – mixing and mastering at The Green Jacket, Canada
Peter Keller - additional arrangements and production on track 1
Emile M. Ashley – photography
Thomas Ewerhard – cover art and artwork

References

2006 albums
Theatre of Tragedy albums
AFM Records albums